Munquad Ali is a politician and Uttar Pradesh state president of Bahujan Samaj Party. He was a Member of the Parliament of India representing Uttar Pradesh in the Rajya Sabha, the upper house of the Indian Parliament.

References

External links
 Profile on Rajya Sabha website

Living people
21st-century Indian Muslims
Bahujan Samaj Party politicians from Uttar Pradesh
Rajya Sabha members from Uttar Pradesh
Year of birth missing (living people)
Place of birth missing (living people)